The Last Flight of the Flamingo  is a 2010 film, based on the 2000 novel of the same name, by Mozambican writer Mia Couto.

Synopsis 
In the village of Tizangara, UN Blue Helmets work as peacekeepers after years of civil war. Five explosions kill five soldiers; only their helmets and their phalluses are left. Massimo Risi, an Italian Lieutenant posted in Maputo, Mozambique’s capital, arrives in the village in order to investigate the events. Assisted by Joaquim, a local translator, Massimo starts the enquiry and soon discovers that not everything is what it appears to be.

External links
 
 

2010 films
Brazilian thriller drama films
French thriller drama films
Italian thriller drama films
Mozambican drama films
Portuguese thriller drama films
Spanish thriller drama films
2010s French films